Cleopatra in Space is an American children's graphic novel series drawn and written since 2014 by Mike Maihack, and published by Graphix, a division of Scholastic.

The premise of the series is that a teenaged Queen Cleopatra is brought to the far future to attend school and fight a space tyrant together with her friends Akila and Brian. So far, six books have been published: Target Practice (2014), The Thief and the Sword (2015), Secret of the Time Tablets (2016), The Golden Lion (2017), Fallen Empires (2019), and Queen of the Nile (2020). Maihack revealed in October 2020 he wrote the protagonist, Cleopatra, as a character with bit of ADHD and having "depressive disorder."

It was adapted into an eponymous animated television series by DreamWorks Animation; the series was first broadcast in Southeast Asia on DreamWorks Channel beginning on November 25, 2019, and was released in the United States on Peacock, which launched on April 15, 2020, to certain customers. Maihack would help produce the TV series.

Reception
Reviews of Maihack's comics have been generally positive. J. Caleb Mozzocco, in School Library Journal, described Target Practice as having an art style with a "touch of anime/manga influence" along with other cartoonist styles, resulting in a clean, simple, and inviting looking to pages, which is well suited for various characters, settings, and technologies, while adding that Cleopatra is a likable character in these comics as a "kick-butt, teen girl heroine." Rich Clabaugh, a staff writer for The Christian Science Monitor built on this, reviewing the same book, writing that they were pleased to see a "strong, spunky female main comic character that will appeal to both girls and boys" and called Maihack a skilled artist who can breathe a "vibrant life into his characters, human, alien, and cat." Robert Greenberger was more critical but still admitted that Maihack is a talented and "clever storyteller" who uses an "expressive and a restrained color palette." Maihack's other comics were also reviewed positively, some calling Secret of the Time Tablets an all ages "sci-fi series full of pizzazz, high energy, and lots of questions to answer" and The Golden Lion as having beautiful illustrations, complete with a "terrific cast of characters that continue to evolve."

Apart from this, others called Maihack's comics "a rollicking all-ages adventure," and involving a "series of Star Trek–style space adventures punctuated with far-future high school drama." On September 11, 2020, Daniel Toy described Target Practice on CNN's Underscored an "action-packed journey through space and time that will excite any young reader" and called the rest of the series "out of this world."

References

External links
 Mike Maihack's Cleopatra in Space website

Depictions of Cleopatra in comics
2014 comics debuts
American graphic novels
Comics about women
Mental health in fiction